The Palatka and Heights Street Railway was a streetcar system in Palatka, Florida, chartered in March 1888 with a 50-year franchise. It opened in January 1889, with three miles of  narrow gauge track. In 1904 it is shown as owning two cars and two horses, though common practice in the South was to use mules rather than horses, and pictures in the Florida State Archives show the P&HSRy car pulled by mules. 

The directors were: Wm. H. Craig, of Orange, New Jersey, President; Thomas Murray, Secretary; E. S. Crill, Treasurer; Henry  S. Wilson; Wm. P. Craig. The general offices were in Palatka, Florida. and J. G. Carter, Manager. Photographs in the Florida State Archives show the tracks on Emmett Avenue and Lemon Street.

See also
 List of Florida street railroads

References

External links 
 Photo of mule-drawn streetcar on the Palatka and Heights Street Railway

3 ft gauge railways in the United States
Florida street railroads
Railway companies established in 1888
1888 establishments in Florida
Palatka, Florida